Chito Saldana Veloso Roño (born April 26, 1954), also known as Sixto Kayko and Chito S. Roño, is a Filipino writer, producer, and director. He is known for his expansive vision and special-effects-heavy films. He came to prominence in the Philippine film industry as a director with socially explosive films like Private Show (1986), and Itanong Mo Sa Buwan (The Moonchild; 1988) with the latter earning accolades from the Gawad Urian Awards. He also won the Metro Manila Film Festival Award for Best Director for the films Nasaan ang Puso (Where is the Heart; 1997), and Yamashita: The Tiger's Treasure (2001). He also directed the family drama Signal Rock (2018) which was the Philippines' entry to the Best Foreign Language Film category at the 91st Academy Awards.

He also directed television shows like Spirits (2004), Lastikman (2007), Magkano ang Iyong Dangal? (How Much is your Dignity?; 2010), Imortal (2010), and Maria Mercedes (2013). He is also Vhong Navarro's manager.

Early life
Chito Saldana Veloso Roño was born on April 26, 1954, in Calbayog, Samar, in the Philippines to Carol and Jose Roño. He is the eldest among six siblings. He is an alumnus of the University of the Philippines College of Mass Communication. During his college days at the university, he was active in Dulaang UP with Tony Mabesa as an actor, stage manager, props man, and director. Chito Roño, with Lizza Nakpil, also founded Rivermaya and Streetboys in 1993.

Filmography

Film director
{{columns-list|
Stella Magtanggol (1986)
Private Show (1986)
Olongapo: The Great American Dream (1987)
Itanong Mo sa Buwan (1988)
Baleleng at ang Gintong Sirena (1988)
Kasalanan Bang Sambahin Kita? (1990)
Bakit Kay Tagal ng Sandali? (1990)
Kailan Ka Magiging Akin (1991)
Narito ang Puso Ko (1992)
Ikaw Lang (1993)
Sige! Ihataw Mo! (1994)Seperada (1994)Minsan Lang Kita Iibigin (1994)Patayin sa Sindak si Barbara (1995)Di Mapigil ang Init (1995)Dahas (1995)Eskapo: The Serge Osmeña-Geny Lopez Story (1995)Nasaan ang Puso (1997)Curacha, ang Babaing Walang Pahinga (1998)Bata, Bata… Pa'no Ka Ginawa? (1998)Ang Babae sa Bintana (1998)Hinahanap-hanap kita (1999)Laro sa Baga (2000)Spirit Warriors (2000)La Vida Rosa (2001)Yamashita: The Tiger's Treasure (2001)Dekada '70 (2002)Spirit Warriors: The Shortcut (2003)Feng Shui (2004)Sukob (2006)Caregiver (2008)Tenement 2 (2009)Emir (2010)Bulong (2011)The Healing (2012)Shake, Rattle and Roll Fourteen: The Invasion (2012)Badil (2013)Boy Golden (2013)The Trial (2014)Feng Shui 2 (2014)Etiquette for Mistresses (2015)The Ghost Bride (2017)
 Signal Rock (2018)
 Kokey (2023)
}}

Television director

WriterBulong (2011)Emir (2010)T2 (2009)Caregiver (2008)Sukob (2006)Feng Shui (2004)Spirit Warriors: The Shortcut (2003)Spirit Warriors (2000)Curacha ang Babaeng Walang Pahinga (1998)Istokwa (1996)Si Baleleng at ang Gintong Sirena (1988)

Film producerHula (2011)

Film editorItanong Mo sa Buwan'' (1988)

Awards

References

External links

1954 births
Living people
Filipino business executives
Filipino film directors
Filipino people of Chinese descent
People from Calbayog
Benigno Aquino III administration personnel